Northern Ireland (Ministers, Elections and Petitions of Concern) Act 2022 is an Act of Parliament that implements parts of the New Decade, New Approach agreement made following the three-year suspension of the Northern Ireland Executive as agreed by the Government of the United Kingdom, Government of Ireland and the political parties of Northern Ireland.

Background 

Following the New Decade, New Approach agreement, the Democratic Unionist Party, Sinn Féin, the Ulster Unionist Party, the Social Democratic and Labour Party, and the Alliance Pary entered into a power sharing Executive on 12 January 2020. This Executive, however, fell due to the resignation of the DUP First Minister over disputes surrounding the Northern Ireland Protocol.

Provisions 
According to the Northern Ireland Office, the legislation has the provisions of: Provide up to four, 6-week periods for appointing Northern Ireland Ministers, including the First Minister and the deputy First Minister, after an election
 Provide up to four, 6-week periods for appointing a First Minister and deputy First Minister after they cease to hold office (in the case of one of them resigning for instance)
 Provide that Northern Ireland Ministers remain in office after an election for up to a maximum of 24 weeks
 Where the First Minister and deputy First Minister cease to hold office, provide that other Northern Ireland Ministers remain in office for a maximum period of 48 weeks since the First Minister and deputy First Minister ceased to hold office or 24 weeks following the subsequent election (whichever is the shortest) unless the Secretary of State triggers the “sufficient representation” provisions;
 Implement reforms to the Petition of Concern mechanism in the Assembly, including a new 14-day consideration period before a valid petition can be confirmed
 Require petitioners to come from more than one Northern Ireland political party
 Prevent the mechanism being used for matter which concern the conduct of a member and for second reading votes on a Bill
 Update the code of conduct for Northern Ireland Ministers in accordance with a request from the Northern Ireland Executive and in line with New Decade, New Approach.

References 

United Kingdom Acts of Parliament 2022
Acts of the Parliament of the United Kingdom concerning Northern Ireland
Politics of Northern Ireland